The following is a list of the television networks and announcers that have broadcast the MLS Cup.

2020s

Note 
2022 - Rodolfo Landeros filled in for Rob Stone due to the latter’s college football commitments.

2010s

2000s

Note 
In August 2006, MLS and ESPN announced an eight-year contract spanning 2007–2014, giving the league its first rights-fee agreement worth $8 million annually. This deal gave league a regular primetime slot on Thursdays, televised coverage of the first round of the MLS SuperDraft, and an expanded presence on other ESPN properties such as ESPN360 (now ESPN3) and Mobile ESPN. The agreement also placed each season's opening match, All-Star Game, and MLS Cup on ABC.
bold simulcast ABC's coverage of MLS Cup 2007 in Canada.

1990s

Note 
On March 15, 1994, Major League Soccer with ESPN and ABC Sports announced the league's first television rights deal without any players, coaches, or teams in place. The three-year agreement committed 10 games on ESPN, 25 on ESPN2, and the MLS Cup on ABC. The deal gave MLS no rights fees but split advertising revenue between the league and networks.

References

External links
Record Low Rating For 2010 MLS Cup
MLS Cup TV Ratings 

Major League Soccer on television
ABC Sports
CBC Sports
Mlscup
Fox Sports announcers
The Sports Network
Broadcasters
Wide World of Sports (American TV series)
Lists of Major League Soccer broadcasters